The Kyzyl-Kiya Airport (Kyrgyz: Кызыл-Кыя аэропорту, Russian: Кызыл-Кийский аэропорт)  serves Kyzyl-Kiya and Pulgon, towns in Kadamjay District of Batken Province (oblast), Kyrgyzstan. The Russian IATA code for Kyzyl-Kiya Airport is КЫК.

Kyzyl-Kiya Airport started operations in the 1930s as a landing strip near the mining town. The current runway and terminal were built in the 1970s. It is a regional class 3C airport. The runway has a weight limit of 22 tonnes, and has no instrument landing facilities and operates only during daylight hours.

Although Kyzyl-Kiya Airport is near the border with Uzbekistan, it has no customs and border control checks and serves only flights within Kyrgyzstan. Until 2002, Kyzyl-Kiya had year-round links with Bishkek, Osh and Cholpon-Ata.

References

External links
 

Airports in Kyrgyzstan
Airports built in the Soviet Union